The Castle on 19th Street or 19th Street Castle is a Mission Revival style house in Cheyenne, Wyoming. It was built in 1914 for local businessman Thomas Heaney, who operated the Atlas Theatre in Cheyenne. Heaney also operated the Tivoli Bar and Restaurant and became a Wyoming state senator representing Laramie County. Heaney's residence  features a three-story corner tower with a broad overhanging tiled and hipped roof, with a stucco parapet surrounding the remainder of the roof, ornamented with projecting crests. A loggia with three arches fronts the house, ornamented with projecting squared beams. The driveway goes through the leftmost arch, flanked by a retaining wall, on its way to the rear of the house. The interior was converted for apartments.

The Castle was placed on the National Register of Historic Places on July 10, 1979.

References

External links
 19th Street Castle at the Wyoming State Historic Preservation Office

National Register of Historic Places in Laramie County, Wyoming
Mission Revival architecture in Wyoming
Buildings and structures completed in 1914